is a passenger railway station located in the city of Niiza, Saitama, Japan, operated by East Japan Railway Company (JR East).

Lines

Station layout

The elevated station consists of two opposed side platforms serving two tracks, with the station building underneath. There is also a centre through-track for west-bound freight services accessing Niiza Freight Terminal to the west of the station. The station is staffed.

The Astro Boy theme tune is used as the departure melody.

Platforms

History
The station opened on 1 April 1973.

Passenger statistics
In fiscal 2019, the station was used by an average of 21,213 passengers daily (boarding passengers only).

Surrounding area
 Atomi University
 Jumonji University
 Rikkyo University Niiza Campus
 Rikkyo Niiza High School
 Niiza Freight Terminal (JR Freight)

See also
 List of railway stations in Japan

References

External links

  

Railway stations in Japan opened in 1973
Stations of East Japan Railway Company
Railway stations in Saitama Prefecture
Musashino Line
Niiza, Saitama